Radio for Peacebuilding Africa (RFPA) was a program founded in 2003 by the international non-profit organization Search for Common Ground. Working on the assumption that radio is the most accessible form of mass communication in Africa, RFPA trained journalists in peacebuilding, conflict resolution, and acting on commonalities.

The countries served by RFPA were Angola, Burundi, Côte d'Ivoire, Democratic Republic of the Congo, Sierra Leone, Guinea, Zimbabwe, Tanzania, Togo, Uganda, Somalia, Rwanda, Nigeria, Niger, Liberia, Kenya, Chad, the Central African Republic, Congo Brazzaville, and Cameroon.

RFPA was created by SFCG and was supported in part by the Ministry of Foreign Affairs of Finland.

Mission

The founders of RFPA believed that radio broadcasters can affect some of the conflict and civil unrest that have affected African countries. However, they found that radio broadcasters exaggerated the violence facing African societies on a daily basis instead of working to temper strife.

By promoting a discussion of the "middle ground" in debates, as well as tempering extreme outlying opinions played on their air, RFPA hoped to show that common ground is possible and that conflicts do not have to be solved by violence.

To support its mission, Radio for Peacebuilding Africa aimed to broaden the skills of broadcasters working in Africa. RFPA supported youth radio broadcasters and encouraged the diversifying of viewpoints on the air.

RFPA worked with politicians to increase the flow of communications between governments and the civil society, as well as encouraging the SFCG mission of acting on the commonalities between different societies and ethnicities. Specifically, RFPA targeted broadcasters, governmental officials and members of the civil society in each state.

To address their mission, RFPA developed a multilingual training guide and module for broadcasters and journalists. They also organized fora and regional conferences to discuss challenges and issues facing projects. They organized two competitions to reward the top programs structured around the themes in the training guides.

Peacebuilding techniques

The founders of RFPA believed that news reporting isn't the only way to promote common ground. Forms of communication such as "soap-opera" style programming, music, theater, and talkshows were designed to promote open discussion of issues and foster ties between communities.

As a part of its mission, RFPA worked to develop a series of guidebooks about peace building techniques through radio. These books were the foundation for the RFPA annual awards. These guidebooks can be applied to all forms of communication worldwide, not just for radio in Africa.

These techniques included inviting all sides of an issue into dialogue, identifying and examining assumptions, challenging stereotypes, sharing hopes, dreams and future visions, giving ordinary people a chance to tell their story, using precise words, clarifying opinions and finding and presenting alternative solutions, among other techniques.

Achievements

As of the summer of 2010, RFPA had more than 3,000 members representing 100 countries, across Sub-Saharan Africa and beyond. The organization produced seven guidebooks that have been downloaded over 4,800 times. They carried out over 90 workshops and trained local radio station personnel.

RFPA claimed that it had reached new levels of cooperation between the government, media and civil society, increased the ability of radio stations to identify the underlying causes of war and conflict, increased the public's access to policy information, and used media to foster communication between policy makers and the civil society within that state, among other achievements.

Countries

Of the countries in which RFPA had programs or participating stations, eleven (Burundi, Central African Republic, Kenya, Liberia, Niger, Nigeria, Senegal, Sierra Leone, Tanzania, Togo, and Uganda) had "partially free" status under Freedom House's 2010 Freedom in the World annual report, which ranked the degree of democracy and political freedom in each country in the world; levels of political freedom and civil rights were ranked on a scale of 1 through 7, and each country was assigned a status of "free", "partially free" or "not free". Nine countries in which RFPA had programs or participating stations (Cameroon, Chad, Congo Brazzaville, DR Congo, Ivory Coast, Rwanda, Somalia, Sudan and Zimbabwe) had "not free" status under the same ranking systems.

Participating stations

Africa:
Africa N°1

Burundi
 Bonesha FM
 Radio Isanganiro
 Radio Publique Africaine

Cameroon
Cameroon Radio Television
Equinoxe
Radio Siantou
Real Time Music
Venus FM

Central African Republic
Radio Ndeke Luka

Chad
Radio nationale tchadienne

Congo Brazzaville
Radio Congo
Radio Liberté

Democratic Republic of the Congo
Canal Revelation
Radio Maendeleo
Radio Okapi
Radio Télévision Nationale Congolaise

Ivory Coast
Onuci-FM
Radio Bonne Santé
Radio Côte d'Ivoire
Radio Espoir
Radio Femmes Solidarité
Radio Yopougon

Kenya
Citizen FM
Hope FM
Kameme FM
Kenya Broadcasting Company
Nation FM

Liberia
Kiss FM
Radio Veritas

Niger
Voix du Sahel ORTN

Nigeria
Federal Radio Corporation of Nigeria
Radio RayPower
Rhythm FM
Voice of Nigeria

Rwanda
Radio Izuba
Radio Rwanda

Sénégal
Afia FM

Sierra Leone
Kiss
Radio Democracy

Somalia
Radio Galkayo
Radio HornAfrik
Radio Voice of Peace

Sudan
Sudan Radio Service

Tanzania
Radio Kwizera

Togo
Nana FM

Uganda
Capital Radio
Mega FM
Paidha FM
West Nile/Pacis

Zimbabwe
Zimbabwe Broadcasting Corporation

References

External links
 

Radio organizations
Mass media in Africa